Jake Zyrus (formerly known under the mononym Charice; born 10 May 1992) is a Filipino singer and television personality.

In 2007, after some appearances on Philippine television, Zyrus sang on The Ellen DeGeneres Show, and the following year, he made several international television appearances, including on The Oprah Winfrey Show. He then began performing in concerts with David Foster and Andrea Bocelli, among others. Zyrus released the studio album Charice in 2010; it entered the Billboard 200 at number eight, making it the first album of an Asian solo singer ever to land in the top 10. The single "Pyramid" from that album, featuring singer Iyaz, is Zyrus's most successful single to date, charting within the top 40 in a number of countries after its debut live performance on The Oprah Winfrey Show. He released further albums Chapter 10 in 2013 and Catharsis in 2016. 

Crossing over to acting on television, he joined the cast of TV series Glee later in 2010 as Sunshine Corazon. In 2011, "Before It Explodes", written by Bruno Mars, was released as the lead single from Zyrus's second international studio album, Infinity. Zyrus was one of the four judges of the Philippine version of The X Factor, on ABS-CBN, in 2012.

Zyrus came out as a gay woman in 2013. In 2017, he came out as a transgender male after having male chest reconstruction and beginning testosterone treatment. He adopted the name Jake Zyrus, and discontinued the use of the name "Charice Pempengco".

Early life
Zyrus was born as Charmaine Clarice Relucio Pempengco in Cabuyao, Laguna province, and was raised by single mother Racquel. To help support the family, Zyrus began to enter singing contests at the age of seven, from town fiestas in various provinces to singing competitions on TV, eventually competing in almost a hundred such contests.

In 2005, Zyrus joined Little Big Star, a talent show in the Philippines loosely patterned after American Idol. Eliminated after the first performance, Zyrus was called back as a wildcard contender and eventually became one of the finalists. Although a consistent top scorer in the final rounds, Zyrus did not win the title in the finale, placing third.

Zyrus made some minor appearances on local television shows and commercials, but essentially fell off the radar after Little Big Star. Only in 2007 did Zyrus gain worldwide recognition after an avid supporter, FalseVoice, started posting a series of performances on YouTube. These videos received over 15 million hits, making Zyrus an internet sensation.

Career

2007–2008: Discovery and early work
In June 2007, producers at Ten Songs/Productions, a music publishing company in Sweden, invited Zyrus to a demo-recording seeing online videos. Zyrus recorded seven songs—six covers and an original song called "Amazing", and was next invited to the South Korean talent show Star King on 13 October 2007, singing "And I Am Telling You I'm Not Going" and a duet of "A Whole New World" with Kyuhyun from Super Junior.

Having seen online videos, Ellen DeGeneres invited Zyrus to appear on her show. He flew to the United States for the first time and performed two songs on 19 December 2007 episode: "I Will Always Love You" and "And I Am Telling You". Following this American debut, Zyrus made a second appearance on Star King on 28 December as the "Most Requested Foreign Act", performing Gloria Gaynor's "I Will Survive" and singing a duet with Lena Park. In January 2008, Zyrus was invited to Malacañang Palace to perform for President Gloria Macapagal Arroyo.

Returning to the international scene, Zyrus next guested on 8 April episode of The Paul O'Grady Show in London, England. The Philippine debut EP Charice was released in May 2008; this mini album, consisting of six songs and six backing tracks, was awarded gold certification in the Philippines in October 2008, and reached platinum status in 2009. Zyrus appeared on the edition of 12 May of The Oprah Winfrey Show in the episode "World's Smartest Kids", where performing Whitney Houston's "I Have Nothing". After the show, Oprah Winfrey contacted David Foster to see what the music producer could do for Pempengco.

Zyrus performed with Foster for the first time as one of the entertainers on 17 May opening of the MGM Grand at Foxwoods Resort Casino in Ledyard, Connecticut. This was followed by a debut on the international concert stage in Foster's 23 May tribute concert, Hitman: David Foster and Friends, at the Mandalay Bay Resort and Casino in Las Vegas, Nevada, performing a medley of songs from The Bodyguard as well as the standard, "And I Am Telling You".

A CD/DVD of this concert, including Zyrus' The Bodyguard medley, was released on 11 November 2008. The show was aired several times on PBS and other public television networks starting in December 2008 under the Great Performances banner. One of the singers at the concert was Pempengco's idol, Andrea Bocelli. Bocelli subsequently expressed interest in performing a duet with Pempengco with an invitation to be a guest on his birthday concert "The Cinema Tribute" held on 20 July at the Teatro del Silenzio in his hometown of Lajatico, Tuscany, Italy. Aside from the solo performance, Zyrus sang a duet of "The Prayer" with the famous tenor in front of more than 8,000 people.

Zyrus was invited to perform for the Feyenoord's Centennial Anniversary in the Netherlands held on 26 September of the same year, singing the team's anthem, "You'll Never Walk Alone" in front of a crowd of about 50,000 football (soccer) fans In a guest appearance on the "Dreams Come True" episode of The Oprah Winfrey Show on 9 September, Oprah referred to Zyrus as "The Most Talented Girl in the World". After singing Celine Dion's "My Heart Will Go On" with David Foster on piano, Zyrus was surprised by Celine Dion's appearance via satellite, at Oprah's invitation, inviting Pempengco to sing a special duet at New York City's Madison Square Garden as part of Dion's Taking Chances Tour. The promised duet took place on 15 September, dedicating "Because You Loved Me" to Pempengco's mother. The performance received rave reviews in the New York Post and The New York Times, and was eventually featured on 19 September episode of The Oprah Winfrey Show. Zyrus would then perform at the Andre Agassi Grand Slam for Children Benefit Concert at the Wynn Las Vegas casino resort. In November, Pempengco and David Foster appeared on Good Morning America to promote Foster's tribute album, Hitman: David Foster and Friends, performing The Bodyguard medley and "I Will Survive".

2009–2010: First major performances

In January 2009, Zyrus performed at two pre-inauguration events in Washington, D.C., in the lead up to the first inauguration of Barack Obama: the "Realizing the Dream" gala at the Hyatt Regency Hotel and the "Pearl Presidential Inaugural Gala" at the Mandarin Hotel. February performances at two post-Oscar award events followed: Oscar Night at Mr. Chow's and Oprah's Oscar After Party, held in the Kodak Theatre. Zyrus then debuted a new original song, "Fingerprint", composed by Robbie Nevil and produced by David Foster, and then appeared in April in the season premiere of Ti lascio una canzone, an Italian musical variety show televised from Teatro Ariston in the city of Sanremo. Zyrus performed "I Will Always Love You", "I Have Nothing", "The Prayer", and "Listen", and went on to sing "The Star-Spangled Banner" in front of 57,000 baseball fans during the Los Angeles Dodgers 52nd season home opener at Dodger Stadium.

In May, Zyrus released a second Philippine album, My Inspiration. The album consists of 12 tracks, including "Always You" and a cover of Helen Reddy's "You and Me Against the World" performed as a duet with Pempengco's mother. The album was certified gold in the Philippines within two months after release, and then platinum in December 2009. Also in May, Zyrus would again perform at a David Foster and Friends concert held at the Mandalay Bay Resort and Casino in Las Vegas, Nevada. On 18 May episode "Finale: Oprah's Search for the World's Most Talented Kids" of The Oprah Winfrey Show, Zyrus debuted a first internationally released single, "Note to God", written by Diane Warren and produced by David Foster. The single was made available for digital download on the same day and debuted at #24 on the Billboard Hot Digital Songs chart, #44 on the Billboard Hot 100, #9 on the Hot Canadian Digital Singles chart and #35 on the Canadian Hot 100. Later that same month, Zyrus was again invited to sing at the Ti lascio una canzone show as a special guest.

The first major concert for Zyrus was called Charice: The Journey Begins, presented to a sold-out crowd on 27 June at the SMX Convention Center, SM Mall of Asia in the Philippines. Guests included Christian Bautista, Kuh Ledesma and Little Big Star finalists. On 28 June 2009, in concert, Zyrus revealed a planned duet with legendary pop singer Michael Jackson, explaining that Jackson's lawyer said that Michael had chosen Zyrus to be his special guest on his tour, but Jackson died before the tour could begin. Zyrus contributed to two Christmas albums in 2009, first as David Archuleta's duet partner for the song "Have Yourself a Merry Little Christmas" on his Christmas album, Christmas from the Heart, then contributing a rendition of "The Christmas Song" to the compilation album, A Very Special Christmas 7. Zyrus was one of the headlining acts on the David Foster and Friends 10-city North American Tour that ran during the fall of 2009, and made a cameo appearance in the feature film Alvin and the Chipmunks: The Squeakquel, released in North America on 23 December. The official movie soundtrack includes Zyrus' rendition of "No One" by Alicia Keys, accompanied by The Chipettes. Later in the month, Zyrus appeared on the grand finale of Singapore Idol as a guest, performing two signature songs, The Bodyguard medley and "Note to God".

2010–2012: Charice and Infinity

On 23 January 2010, Zyrus appeared on Io Canto, a renowned singing competition in Italy, performing international standards and an Italian favorite called "Adagio" (made popular by Lara Fabian), in Italian. On 31 January Zyrus was featured as one of the musical acts on the NBC Sports program Silk Soy Milk Skate for the Heart, raising awareness of heart disease. Zyrus performed "Note to God" and debuted two new songs included in the debut album, "In This Song" and "Breathe Out" (later retitled as "Breathe You Out"). The album version and club remixes of a second single from the international debut album, "Pyramid" (featuring Iyaz), were released on 23 February 2010 and 2 March 2010, while Reprise Records dropped the album itself on 11 May 2010. On the same day the launch, he made another guest appearance on The Oprah Winfrey Show along with Justin Bieber. Pempengco's worldwide promotion of the album was the subject of a 12-part mini-documentary 30 Days with Charice, filmed by Alloy TV and published at Teen.com. On 22 June, Pempengco confirmed joining the cast of the hit US television series Glee for its second season. Later the same week, Charice released a promotional single called "Crescent Moon" in Japan, an English rendition of the Japanese song "Mikazuki" by Ayaka.

During the inauguration of Philippine President Benigno Aquino III on 30 June 2010, Zyrus sang the Philippine national anthem in front of a crowd estimated at more than half a million. July's promotional tour for the album took Zyrus to Thailand, the Philippines, Japan and South Korea, including a third appearance on Star King. On 7 September the premiere of Glee'''s second season was held in Hollywood with Zyrus in attendance. Zyrus' character Sunshine Corazon, an exchange student from the Philippines, presents lead character Rachel Berry (played by Lea Michele) with serious competition. On 30 November, Zyrus appeared on NBC's Christmas in Rockefeller Center, performing two songs from the Christmas EP, "Grown-Up Christmas List" and "Jingle Bell Rock", with producer and mentor David Foster. Zyrus also performed "The Prayer" with the Canadian Tenors and David Foster on the piano for a Christmas special on CBC Television. In December of that year, Zyrus became Operation Smile's official Smile Ambassador, joining such celebrities as Jessica Simpson, Billy Bush, and Zachary Levi in the organization's global efforts to provide free surgeries to children born with cleft lip, cleft palate and other facial deformities. On 8 January 2011, Zyrus was launched as the new endorser of Aficionado Germany Perfume; this event, at the SM Mall of Asia Concert Grounds, titled 1@11, gathered an audience of 85,000. On 13 February 2011, Jake's music special Charice: Home for Valentine's was broadcast on the GMA 7 television network in the Philippines. From 21 to 25 February, Zyrus embarked on a solo tour to Japan, performing in four shows held at three Zepp music halls, in Nagoya, Tokyo dates and Osaka.

It was announced that Zyrus had begun to record new material for an upcoming second international album. The comeback single, "Before It Explodes", written by Bruno Mars, was released on 18 April 2011. The day after its release, another single, "One Day" was released on iTunes, co-written and co-produced with Nick Jonas. "Louder", the third single, was released on 20 May bundled with another song, "Lost The Best Thing". On 14 September 2011, it was revealed in a Japanese broadcast that Zyrus would be singing the theme song to the video game Final Fantasy XIII-2, "New World". The second studio album, Infinity, was released exclusively in Japan on 5 October 2011.

On 18 January 2012, Zyrus launched a ten-city tour across Asia to promote the official release of the studio album, Infinity, due later in 2012; the tour began in March.

2013–2015: Chapter 10 and Power of Two
On 8 June 2013, Zyrus revealed plans to release his third album in the Philippines entitled Chapter 10, containing covers of a few favorite modern songs, before heading back to Los Angeles to record more a new international album. The album was released on 6 September 2013 through Star Records; the lead single was a cover of "Titanium". On 3 August 2013, it was announced that on 10 August GMA Network's drama anthology series Magpakailanman would air an episode titled "The Charice Pempengco Story", in which Zyrus reenacted scenes based on real life. A joint concert with Aiza Seguerra followed on 28 September at the Smart-Araneta Coliseum, dubbed the "Power of Two".

Zyrus sang "Right Where I Belong" for the direct-to-DVD movie The Swan Princess: A Royal Family Tale (2014). In interviews, Zyrus reported almost losing the role after publicly coming out as lesbian in 2013. Zyrus appeared on 19 October 2014 episode of Oprah: Where Are They Now?.

In 2015, Zyrus reunited with Foster to perform a version of Sam Smith's "Lay Me Down" on Asia's Got Talent.

Artistry

Influences

In 2010, Zyrus said that his mother, a former pop vocalist, served as a primary musical influence; He begged her for singing lessons beginning at the age of four. Growing up, the family listened to many types of music, especially artists such as Celine Dion, Whitney Houston, Mariah Carey, and Destiny's Child. Zyrus has also expressed admiration for Lady Gaga and Beyoncé for attitude, fashion, and vocal style, and stated a wish to work with both of them someday. Zyrus was also a fan of Michael Jackson, and Justin Timberlake and wished to work with Eminem, Dr. Dre, Chris Brown and Ne-Yo. Zyrus performed "Earth Song" by Michael Jackson with Ne-Yo at the David Foster and Friends Special in Mandalay Bay, Las Vegas in October 2010.

Voice
Prior to his transition, when he was known as Charice, Zyrus received positive recognition for his vocal talents. In an ABC News interview, David Foster mentioned Zyrus' ability to mimic other people's voices, which, according to him, is a characteristic of good singers. In a separate interview, Josh Groban stated that Zyrus' voice is one of the most beautiful he had heard in a long time. Ryan Murphy, the executive music producer of the hit US television series Glee, said, "When that girl  opens her mouth, angels fly out." Oprah's bookazine, Oprah's Farewell Celebration: Inside 25 Extraordinary Years of 'The Oprah Winfrey Show, mentioned Zyrus' "soaring soprano voice". After his transition from female to male, Zyrus received criticism that his gender transition destroyed [his] voice ...  but [he] dreams of having an international following" again; an article in AsiaOne.com described his voice as an "increasingly confident tenor".

Personal life
Raised in the Iglesia ni Cristo faith, Zyrus and younger brother Carl were baptized and confirmed into their mother's Roman Catholic faith on 22 May 2010, 12 days after Zyrus's 18th birthday, at the Pasig Cathedral in Pasig,  Metro Manila, Philippines. The more than 40 godparents included ABS-CBN network president Charo Santos-Concio, producer Laurenti Dyogi, The Buzz hosts Boy Abunda and Kris Aquino, segment host and radio personality Jobert Sucaldito, TV Patrol news anchors Karen Davila and Julius Babao, and Star Records head Annabelle Regalado-Borja. Philippine Daily Inquirer columnists Emmie Velarde and Pocholo Concepcion were also included. Oprah Winfrey and David Foster, two principal sponsors who played a major role in Zyrus's ascent to international stardom, were unable to attend and instead sent their own representatives to the ceremony.

In October 2011, Zyrus' estranged father, 43-year-old construction worker Ricky Pempengco, was stabbed to death in the Philippines, forcing the cancellation of a concert in Singapore. Ricky had been at a small grocery store in San Pedro, Laguna, a city south of Metro Manila, when he brushed against a drunk man who became angry and stabbed him with an ice pick in the chest and back, according to the Laguna province police chief. Zyrus responded to the stabbing on Twitter:  "I want to thank my fans from around the world for their support and love at this very difficult time for my family and I."  "We are all very sad about this terrible tragedy" and "I loved him and I will still love him"; "He's still my Dad after all."

Zyrus' exploration of his gender identity was a subject of public interest. In March 2012, Zyrus faced harsh criticism from the Internet and the media after changing his hairstyle and fashion into a self-described "edgy and rock" look, responding: "I know some people think that this is very rebellious but it's not. It's just me evolving." On 16 April 2013, questions were raised after pictures surfaced online of Zyrus in masculine dress. In an interview, mother Raquel Pempengco said that she would respect her child's decision about his own identity. On 28 May, The Philippine Star newspaper ran a story about Zyrus' 21st birthday party which was described as a "coming out of sorts". On 2 June 2013, Zyrus said that he identified as lesbian at that time during an interview with Boy Abunda at The Buzz in the Philippines, mentioning past relationships with other women in the industry. Nine months later, in March 2014, Zyrus debuted a new "boyish" look with much shorter hair cut and more tattoos.   In a 2014 interview with Oprah Winfrey, Zyrus mentioned being attracted to girls since childhood and said "basically, my soul is male", but denied plans to pursue gender transition at that time.

In April 2017, Zyrus broke up with Alyssa Quijano, after four years of living together. In June 2017, Zyrus announced the adopting of his current name and stopped the use of Charice, a name he previously went by, on Twitter and Instagram. Subsequently, Zyrus disclosed that he had undergone removal of both breasts in March, and had begun testosterone shots in April. In an interview with Papermag, he said "I am always thankful for the life of Charice that I experienced and the music that I shared, but that obviously belongs to her, it's not for me. I'm letting her go and be free."

Awards and recognition

3rd Place – Little Big Star Big Division, Season 1, 2005 Philippines
Most Requested Foreign Act of 2007 – StarKing, South KoreaThe Ellen DeGeneres Show, USA
Pinoy World Class Talent – 20th anniversary of the Music Museum, 2008, Philippines
Key to the City of Rotterdam – Mayor Ivo Opstelten, 2008, the Netherlands
Best New Female Recording Artist – Aliw Awards, 2008, Philippines
Best New Female Artist 2008 - ALIW Awards: Philippines
Newsmaker of the Year 2008, 2009 and 2010 – Balitang America, USA
People of the Year 2008 – People Asia Magazine, 2009, Philippines
Plaque of Recognition – The Spirit of EDSA Foundation, 2009, Philippines
Special Citation Award – MYX Music Awards 2009, Philippines
National Newsmaker of the Year 2008 – Ateneo de Davao University TAO Awards, 2009, Philippines
Outstanding Global Achievement – 40th Box Office Entertainment Awards (Guillermo Awards), 2009, Philippines
Best Selling Album of the Year – 22nd Awit Awards, 2009, Philippines
Best Musical Performance of 2009 – The Oprah Winfrey Show, USA
Person of the Year for 2009 – Philnews.com, Philippines
MDWK Magazine's Top Newsmakers of 2009 – Asian Journal's MDWK Magazine, Philippines
Fun, Fearless Female Award – Cosmopolitan Magazine Philippines, 2010
21 Under 21: Music's Hottest Minors (Number 4) – Billboard, 2010 USA
Icon of Tomorrow – J-14 Magazine, 2010 USA
BPInoy Award: Outstanding Filipino – Bank of the Philippine Islands, 2010 Philippines
Best Inspirational or Religious Song (for "Always You") – 23rd Awit Awards, 2010, Philippines
Number 4 in Yahoo!'s 2010 Most Irresistible Lyrics for "Pyramid" – Yahoo!, 2010
Number 7 in Reader's Choice Favorite Album of 2010: ChariceBest New Artist – J-Wave Tokio Hot 100 Awards 2011 (Japan)
Female Concert Performer of the Year – 42nd Box Office Entertainment Awards, 2011, Philippines
Number 11 in US Weeklys Hottest Glee Guests List: February 2011 (USA)
Number 79 in Entertainment Weekly (USA, 2011)
2011 GMMSF Box-Office Entertainment Awards - Female Concert Performer of the Year
BPinoy Award – Philippines
Womanity Award Winner – Entertainment: Female Network's Womanity Awards
Number 2 in Hottest Girl Chart: August 2011 issue of J-14 MagazineCoolest Female Singer Award: Yahoo! OMG Awards Philippines
Best Major Concert (Female Category) – 24th Aliw Awards, 2011, Philippines
Entertainer of the Year – 24th Aliw Awards, 2011, Philippines
Favorite Asian Act – Nickelodeon Kids' Choice Awards 2012, [USA]

Discography

Studio albumsMy Inspiration (2009)Charice (2010)Infinity (2011)Chapter 10 (2013)Catharsis (2016)

Extended playsCharice (2008)Grown-Up Christmas List (2010)Evolution (2019)

Filmography
Note: Prior to his appearance on Tonight with Boy Abunda'' in 2017, Zyrus' gender identity as a trans man was not known to the wider public. He was credited as his pre-transition name "Charice" prior to this television appearance.

References

External links

 

1992 births
Living people
21st-century Filipino male actors
21st-century Filipino  male singers
ABS-CBN personalities
GMA Network personalities
TV5 (Philippine TV network) personalities
Converts to Roman Catholicism from Unitarianism
Filipino child singers

English-language singers from the Philippines
Filipino male film actors
Filipino male pop singers
Filipino male television actors
Filipino Roman Catholics
Filipino YouTubers
Former members of Iglesia ni Cristo
Filipino LGBT singers
Filipino LGBT songwriters
Filipino transgender people
LGBT Roman Catholics
Male actors from Laguna (province)
YouTube channels launched in 2005
Participants in Philippine reality television series
People from Cabuyao
Reprise Records artists
Singers from Laguna (province)
Star Magic
Star Music artists
Tagalog people
Tenors
Transgender male actors
Transgender male musicians
LGBT media personalities
Music YouTubers
Warner Records artists
Transgender singers
Transgender songwriters